Tom Schaar (born September 14, 1999) is an American professional skateboarder. He was the first skateboarder to land a "1080," which is three revolutions. He became the youngest X Games gold medalist after completing the first 1080 in a competition at the 2012 Asia X Games in Shanghai; youngest Dew Tour champion, the youngest Vans Pool Party champion, and the youngest "Big Air" gold medalist at the Austin X Games. Before turning 18 years old, Schaar was a nine-time X Games Medalist. On March 20, 2019 Schaar was named to the first-ever U.S.A Skateboarding National Team and will be competing for a spot to represent the USA at the 2020 Summer Olympics in Tokyo. Forbes Magazine listed Schaar to their 2020 30 Under 30 Sports category highlighting the next generation of Sports talent.

Skateboarding career

900

In October 2011, Schaar became the 8th person in history to land a 900 on a skateboard.

In September 2016, Schaar became the 1st person in history to land a Stalefish 900 on a skateboard.

1080

In 2006, skateboarder and snowboarder Shaun White unsuccessfully attempted the 1080 on 21 occasions at that year's X Games and 29 occasions the year before. It had previously been considered the "Holy Grail of skateboarding tricks". At age 6, Schaar had watched White's 2006 attempts from the stands.

In March 2012, at the age of 12, Schaar landed the first 1080 on a skateboard after four previous (unsuccessful) attempts. Schaar commented to ESPN.com, "It was the hardest trick I've ever done, but it was easier than I thought.".  He completed the feat on a mega ramp.

At the Asian X Games, he won skate Mini Mega by landing the 1080, and became the first to land a 1080 on a skateboard in a competition and the youngest ever to win an X Games gold medal at the age of 12.

Sponsors
Schaar's main sponsors are Element Skateboards, Vans Shoes, and Monster Energy.

Training
Schaar performs exercises that focus on boosting his strength, lower body power, and core strength while attempting to improve his flexibility & mobility.

Records

Contest history 
 4th in 2019 X Games Minneapolis Skateboard Park
 1st in 2019 Vans Pool Party Pros Division
 3rd in 2018 Vans Park Series Suzhou
 3rd in 2018 X Games Minneapolis Skateboard Park
 1st in 2018 Vans Park Series Sao Paulo
 1st in 2018 Vans Pool Party Pros Division
 2nd in 2018 Air & Style LA Skateboard Best Trick ãã
 3rd in 2018 Air & Style LA Skateboard Park
 3rd in 2018 Bowl-A-Rama Bondi Beach
 2nd in 2017 X Games Minneapolis Skateboard Park
 2nd in 2017 X Games Minneapolis Skateboard Big Air
 1st in 2017 Vans Pool Party Pros Division
 2nd in 2017 Bowl-A-Rama Bondi Beach
 3rd in 2017 Vans Park Series Shanghai
 1st in 2017 Vans Park Series Huntington Beach
 3rd in 2017 Vans Park Series Vancouver
 2nd in 2017 Vans Park Series Malmö
 4th in 2017 Vans Park Series São Paulo
 1st in 2017 Vans Park Series Sydney 
 4th in 2016 Vans Park Series Huntington Beach
 5th in 2016 Vans Park Series Floripa
 6th in 2016 Vans Park Series Melbourne
 5th in 2016 X Games Austin Skateboard Park
 3rd in 2016 Bowl-A-Rama Bondi Beach
 3rd in 2015 X Games Austin Big Air Doubles, partnered with Zack Warden
 3rd in 2015 X Games Austin Skateboard Big Air
 1st in 2015 Vans Pool Party Pros Division
 1st in 2014 X Games Austin Skateboard Big Air
 2nd in 2014 Dew Tour Skateboard Bowl Ocean City Maryland
 4th in 2014 Van Doren Invitational Vancouver Skateboard Park 
 2nd in 2013 X Games Los Angeles Skateboard Big Air
 3rd in 2013 X Games Munich Skateboard Big Air
 6th in 2013 X Games Munich Skateboard Vert
 4th in 2013 Dew Tour Skateboard Bowl Ocean City Maryland
 4th in 2013 X Games Barcelona Skateboard Big Air
 9th in 2013 X Games Barcelona Skateboard Park
 5th in 2013 Vans Pool Party Pros Division
 4th in 2013 X Games Foz do Iguaçu Skateboard Big Air
 6th in 2013 X Games Foz do Iguaçu Skateboard Vert
 1st in 2012 Dew Tour Skateboard Mega 2.0 Ocean City Maryland
 5th in 2012 Dew Tour Skateboard Bowl Ocean City Maryland
 6th in 2012 X Games Los Angeles Skateboard Big Air
 7th in 2012 X Games Los Angeles Skateboard Vert
 1st in 2012 X Games Shanghai Skateboard Mega 2.0
 4th in 2012 X Games Shanghai Skateboard Vert

References

External links

American skateboarders
Living people
1999 births
Place of birth missing (living people) 
X Games athletes